Beloved Beauty (Krasa nenaglyadnaya) is a 1958 feature-length stop motion-animated film from the Soviet Union.  The film, which was made at the Soyuzmultfilm studio, is based on Russian folk tales.

Plot
Once upon a time there were the tsar with the tsaritsa also there was at them a son Ivan-Tsarevich. And everything would be good if Ivan parents didn't come one morning and didn't tell them about the Beloved Beauty about which to it nurses sang, and now every day dreams. Also he wants to go in this world to look for to Beloved Beauty. Ivan-Tsarevich went, and to him the robber Bulat who became a sworn brother on the way. They began to look for Beauty. And it appeared that Koschei the Immortal who didn't want to obey him in any way. Here Ivan-Tsarevich with Bulat won to Koschei, and Beloved Beauty and Mar'yushka, Koschei's servant, got out. They were then also brought to the Tsar's chambers, and the Tsar organized two weddings and they lived happily ever after. The End.

Creators

The edition on DVD
In 2008 was published in the collection of animated films together with "The Night Before Christmas" on DVD under distribution of the Krupnyy Plan company.

 Sound — the Russian Dolby Digital 2.0 Mono;
 Regional code — 0 (All);
 The image — Standard 4:3 (1,33:1);
 Color — PAL.
 Packing — the Collection edition.

See also
History of Russian animation
List of animated feature films
List of stop-motion films

References

External links
Krasa nenaglyadnaya at the Animator.ru (Russian and English)

 (Russian)
Krasa nenaglyadnaya at myltik.ru 

1958 animated films
1958 films
Russian animated fantasy films
Films based on fairy tales
Films based on Russian folklore
Soviet animated films
1950s stop-motion animated films
Soyuzmultfilm
1950s Russian-language films